Asellus may refer to:
Asellus (genus), a genus of crustaceans
Gamma Cancri, a star also known as "Asellus Borealis"
Delta Cancri, a star also known as "Asellus Australis"